Chhonhup  is a village development committee in Mustang District in the Dhawalagiri Zone of northern Nepal. At the time of the 1991 Nepal census it had a population of 1047 people living in 192 individual households.

References

External links
UN map of the municipalities of Mustang District

Populated places in Mustang District